Uffi may refer to:
 Uffi of Jutland, a legendary king

UFFI stands for:
 Urea-formaldehyde foam insulation

See also 
 Uffie (born 1980), American musician
 Ufi (disambiguation)